The marbled skink (Oligosoma oliveri) is a species of skink in the family Scincidae. The species is endemic to New Zealand.

Etymology
The specific name, oliveri, is in honor of New Zealand ornithologist Walter Oliver.

Reproduction
O. oliveri is viviparous.

References

Further reading
Chapple DG, Ritchie PA, Daugherty CH (2009). "Origin, diversification, and systematics of the New Zealand skink fauna (Reptilia: Scincidae)". Molecular Phylogenetics and Evolution 52 (2): 470–487.
McCann C (1955). "The Lizards of New Zealand. Gekkonidae and Scincidae". Dominion Museum Bulletin (17): 1–127. (Leiolopisma oliveri, new species, pp. 76–77, 79, 94 + Plate XIII, figures 1–5).
van Winkel D, Baling M, Hitchmough R (2019). Reptiles and Amphibians of New Zealand: A Field Guide. Auckland, New Zealand: Auckland University Press. viii + 366 pp. (Oligosoma oliveri, pp. 157, 286–287, 297–298).

Reptiles of New Zealand
Oligosoma
Reptiles described in 1955
Taxa named by Charles McCann
Taxonomy articles created by Polbot